You Boyz Make Big Noize is a song by the British rock band Slade, which was released in 1987 as a non-album single. It was written by lead vocalist Noddy Holder and bassist Jim Lea, and produced by Lea. Named after the band's 1987 album of the same name, the song reached No. 94 in the UK, remaining in the chart for the one week.

The song did not appear on the UK/European release of the You Boyz Make Big Noize album. However, later editions would add the song as the thirteenth track. For the album's CBS release in the United States, "You Boyz Make Big Noize" was included, replacing the fourth track "Fools Go Crazy".

Background
Shortly prior to the release of Slade's fourteenth studio album You Boyz Make Big Noize, the band returned to the recording studio to record a song of the same name. After the album failed to generate the expected level of commercial success, RCA opted not to release the song of the same name, but allowed the band to release it on the independent label Cheapskate. Released in July 1987, it reached No. 94 in the UK. CBS, Slade's American label, liked the song and had it included on the album which was released later in the year.

"You Boyz Make Big Noize" features Beastie Boys rap-styled verses. Prior to the song's release, guitarist Dave Hill described the song as "a rock rap thing with a Beastie Boys feel to it." The song featured vocals from Vicki Brown, and in a 1987 fan club interview, Lea explained how Brown came to be on the song: "She was wandering along a corridor and Noddy said "ere, you're female, do you want to be on our record?" She was not supposed to sing, she was supposed to say two lines but she sang one of the lines and she had this amazing voice. I wish we had written more for her."

Release
"You Boyz Make Big Noize" was released on 7" and 12" vinyl by Cheapskate Records in the UK only. The B-side, "Boyz (Instrumental)", was exclusive to the single and would later appear on the band's 2007 compilation B-Sides. On the 12" single, an extended version of "You Boyz Make Big Noize", dubbed as the "Noize Remix", was featured as the A-side. The lead guitar on the remix was played by Lea. A second B-side was also included; the "U.S.A Mix" of the song. The artwork for the single is the same as that of the You Boyz Make Big Noize album.

Promotion
No music video was filmed to promote the single. In the UK, on 15 August, the band appeared on the ITV show Get Fresh to perform the song. Bren Laidler featured with the band, miming Brown's part in the song.

Critical reception
Upon release, Kerrang! were favourable of the song, particularly the "Noize Remix". They said that Holder's rap "proves they've got the measure of those nasty Beasties, who could learn a lesson or two from the original rabble rousers". In a review of the You Boyz Make Big Noize album, American newspaper Record-Journal described the song as a "rock-rap novelty cut".

Formats
7" Single
"You Boyz Make Big Noize" - 3:01
"Boyz (Instrumental)" - 3:02

12" Single
"You Boyz Make Big Noize (Noize Remix)" - 5:31
"You Boyz Make Big Noize (Instrumental Boyz Version)" - 3:01
"You Boyz Make Big Noize (The USA Mix)" - 3:00

Chart performance

Personnel
Slade
Noddy Holder - lead vocals
Jim Lea - bass, vocals, producer
Dave Hill - lead guitar, vocals
Don Powell - drums

Additional personnel
Vicki Brown - vocals

References

1987 songs
1987 singles
Slade songs
Songs written by Noddy Holder
Songs written by Jim Lea
Song recordings produced by Jim Lea